Rajshahi University of Engineering & Technology, commonly known as RUET (রুয়েট), is a PhD granting public research university in Bangladesh. It is one of the oldest public universities in the country that specialises in the field of Engineering. Like the other public engineering universities in Bangladesh, a student had to go through a written examination to get admitted into RUET, but since 2020 RUET  has been taking their entrance examination in MCQ format being combined with  CUET and KUET. RUET is considered  as one of the most top-ranked public universities of Bangladesh.

RUET was founded in 1964 as Rajshahi Engineering College with a limited number of students. It was then changed to Bangladesh Institute of Technology (BIT) in 1986 and was finally renamed Rajshahi University of Engineering & Technology (RUET) in 2003 when it gained a university status.

At present, more than 3500 students are pursuing their higher study in this green campus including under-graduate and post-graduate with over 250 prominent faculty members in diverse field of expertise. The medium of instruction and necessary assessment of this university is English.

History 
Before the independence of Bangladesh, the then Government of Pakistan, to meet the increasing demand of professional engineers for the national development, established Rajshahi Engineering College in 1964 as a faculty of engineering under the University of Rajshahi. It was the second engineering college established in the then East Pakistan.

Rajshahi Engineering College ( was commonly known as REC) started its journey with only three departments: Mechanical Engineering, Electrical & Electronic Engineering and Civil Engineering, offering bachelor's degree programs only. It accepted its first class of 120 students in the academic session of 1964–65 and the second class of like number in the academic session of 1965–66. The teaching faculty consisted of 19 faculty members at that time.

After the independence of Bangladesh (1971), the administration of the college was controlled by the Ministry of Education of Bangladesh and academic curriculum was controlled by University of Rajshahi. However, the infrastructural development and maintenance was taken care of by the Public Works Department of Government of Bangladesh. To remove these kinds of aforesaid problems several committees and commissions were formed since 1973. On the recommendation of these committees and commissions, in 1986, Rajshahi Engineering College was converted to an institute and was named Bangladesh Institute of Technology (BIT), Rajshahi to enhance the technical education.

In September, 2003, the institute was upgraded to a university and was named as Rajshahi University of Engineering & Technology (RUET) to enhance the technical education and research. From that time, the university is financed by the Government through the University Grants Commission (UGC) of Bangladesh. The university is an autonomous statutory organisation of the Government of Bangladesh functioning within the "Rajshahi University of Engineering & Technology: Act 2003".

Campus
RUET is situated in the northern part of Bangladesh, in the city of Rajshahi— the educational center of North Bengal. The RUET campus has been described as representing a "spectacular harmony of architecture and natural beauty".

The distinguishable seasons in Bangladesh are summer and winter. In summer season (May–October) temperature of Rajshahi is hot and typically 25-40 degree Celsius and sometimes humid. In winter season (November–April) temperature is moderate typically 8-20 degree Celsius.

List of vice-chancellors 

Dr. Md. Sazzad Hossain (Additional-Charge)
Md. Rafiqul Islam Sheikh

Faculties and departments
RUET has currently eighteen departments under four faculties. The university has taken to plan open more departments which was under process.

Faculty of Mechanical Engineering
 Department of Mechanical Engineering (ME)
 Department of Industrial & Production Engineering (IPE)
 Department of Glass & Ceramic Engineering (GCE)
 Department of Mechatronics Engineering (MTE)
 Department of Materials Science & Engineering (MSE)
 Department of Chemical & Food Process Engineering (CFPE)

Faculty of Civil Engineering 
 Department of Civil Engineering (CE)
 Department of Urban & Regional Planning (URP)
 Department of Architecture (Arch.)
 Department of Building Engineering & Construction Management (BECM)

Faculty of Electrical & Computer Engineering 
 Department of Computer Science & Engineering (CSE)
 Department of Electrical & Electronic Engineering (EEE)
 Department of Electronics & Telecommunication Engineering (ETE)
 Department of Electrical & Computer Engineering(ECE)

Faculty of Applied Science and Engineering 
 Department of Chemistry (Chem)
 Department of Mathematics (Math)
 Department of Physics (Phy)
 Department of Humanities (Hum)

Academics

Research

Research projects 
RUET won a total of three projects (excluding BdREN project) for improving postgraduate research facilities and producing quality postgraduates from the "Higher Education Quality Enhancement Project (HEQEP)" funded by the World Bank and the Government of Bangladesh during the period of 2014 – 2017. Lists of ongoing research project are as follows:
 Improvement of research capabilities of Mechanical Engineering Department of RUET for producing quality postgraduates and enhancing research outreach.
 Improving research facilities in Mechanical Engineering Department of RUET for post-graduate studies.
 Development of teaching learning facilities for undergraduate & graduate program in Mechanical Engineering Department of RUET

Research institutes 
RUET has currently following research institutes:
 Institute of  Information and Communication Technology (IICT)
 Institute of  Energy and Environmental Studies (IEES)
 Institute of  Natural Hazard & Disaster Management (INHDM)
RUET has already taken plan to open more research institutes to enhance the technical education and research activities.

Research and extension unit 
The research and outreach program of RUET is conducted by the research and extension unit. The main responsibilities of this unit is management of research, innovation, research publications, research planning, implementation, research related activities and research related communication with public and private sectors in nation and international level.

International collaboration 
RUET has collaborative agreements with foreign institute and will extend further to enhance the research work, technical knowledge and skills. The collaborative areas covered are joint research activities, joint hosting of seminars, conferences and symposia, exchange of students (both UG and PG), exchange of faculty members, exchange of academic materials, publications and information etc. At present, the collaboration of RUET exists with the following ones. 
 Kitami Institute of Technology (KIT)
 University of the Ryukyus
 Saitama University

International conferences 
For the last few years, RUET has been organising national and international conferences in its campus to enhance the research capabilities of its students and faculties. Among the conferences organised by RUET, the following ones are notable.
 International Conference on Mechanical, Industrial and Materials Engineering (ICMIME): Organised biennially by the faculty of Mechanical Engineering
 International Conference on Electrical, Computer and Telecommunication Engineering (ICECTE): Organised biennially by the faculty of Electrical and Computer Engineering
 International Conference on Planning, Architecture and Civil Engineering (ICPACE):  Organised biennially by the faculty of Civil Engineering
 International Conference on Electrical and Electronic Engineering (ICEEE): Organised biennially by the department of Electrical and Electronic Engineering
 International Conference on Computer & Information Engineering (ICCIE): Organised biennially by the department of Computer Science and Engineering

Admission 
Getting into this engineering university RUET, it appears as hard admission test  to the aspiring candidates. Throughout Bangladesh after completing the higher secondary level every students have to fulfill the requirements.

Undergraduate
The undergraduate admissions process begins after all education boards of the country declare the results of the Higher Secondary Certificate (HSC) examinations. After initial assortment according to HSC result, a certain number of eligible candidates are shortlisted for an elaborate written test. Usually application for admission start from September of each year, and an admission test is usually held in October or November as per decision of the admission committee. A total of 875 students were admitted in 2016.

Post-graduate
Admission notices for the post-graduate program usually circulate twice a year, in April and October. The notice is advertised on the university website. The list of valid candidates is published on the university website upon completion of the preliminary process and call for viva.

Facilities

Laboratories 
Most of the newly established departments of the RUET have enough laboratory facilities. The older ones have enough laboratory facilities not only for academic research but also for consultancy services. RUET is taking steps for establishing laboratory facilities for the newly established departments and for enhancing laboratory facilities for the older ones.

Further development 
In February, 2017, Executive Committee of National Economic Council (ECNEC) has approved 3.40 billion Taka to implement a mega project for the RUET, aiming to well decorate and development the whole campus and its education and research. The ECNEC approved the project in the name of "Further Development Project of RUET".

Student life

Accommodation 
Student dormitories (called halls) are important features in campus life. There are seven residential halls. One of them, namely Deshratna Sheikh Hasina Hall, is for female students and the remaining ones are for male students. The administrative head of a hall is its provost, usually chosen from the more senior teachers. The halls are mostly named after national heroes and leaders. These are listed below with their capacities:

Organisations and clubs
Students of RUET are involved in different organisations and clubs of the university. Members of these organisations and clubs organise different national programs at RUET. They also participate in different national and international competitions and shows indomitable performances. Some of the leading organisations and clubs of RUET are mentioned here. 
 IEEE RUET Student Branch
 Robotic Society of RUET (RSR)
 Society of Automotive Engineers-RUET (SAER)
 Civil Engineering Society of RUET
 RUET Debating Club (RUET DC)
 RUET Career Forum (RCF)
 Telecommunication Club
 RUET Blood Directory(RBD)
 RUET Analytical Programming Lab (RAPL)
 Astronomy and Science Society of RUET ( ASSR )
 অনুরণন: The cultural Club of RUET
 সমানুপাতিক : A voluntary organisation of RUET
 Photographic Society of RUET (PSR) 
 RUET Cricket Club
 RUET Tabligh
 RUET Football Club (RUET FC)
 Society of Computer Aided Designer, RUET (SCADR)
 RUET Earthquake Society
 RUET AutoCad Club
 Tennis Club RUET 
 Team Crack Platoon
 RUET Fitness Club
 নিরাপদ রক্তের বন্ধন(নিরব) : A voluntary blood donating organisation of RUET
 Machine Learning Group Of RUET
 RUET English Language Club (RELC)
 RUET Firefox Club
 Cube Club of RUET
 RUET Film Club
 Mathematical Society of RUET
 RUET Tourist Club
 RUET HAWKS (RUET Basketball Club)
 RUET Chess Club
 Innovation Society of RUET (ISR)
 Meditation Club of RUET (MCR)

Others 
The athletic club of the university provides multi-purpose sports facilities to the students to acquire physical fitness indispensable for a healthy mind and body. The university maintains a beautiful playground for football, cricket, badminton, volleyball, long tennis, basketball, etc. Indoor facilities are also available in the physical education building close to the playground.

RUET has a library, a central computer center, an auditorium, a canteen, a cafeteria, a medical center, a postal service and a banking service. RUET also has its own regular bus service almost everywhere in the Rajshahi city for the convenience of student transportation. Students these are residing in the city outside the campus can take this transport service to reached the campus due time.

Awards
 RUET won the IEEE Photonics GSF Award, USA in October 2009
 RUET won the Marubun Research Promotion Award, Japan in March 2009

Education cost
Yearly academic cost is $40 (approximately 2800 Taka) in all departments. Admission cost is $213 (approximately 18,000 Taka) including academic cost (admission, session, registration and student fees), medical costs, library, sports, convocation (3500 Taka) and others expenditure and for one time in four years bachelor's degree.

Photos

See also
 List of Universities in Bangladesh
 BUET
 BUTEX
 CUET
 KUET
 DUET
 University Grants Commission (Bangladesh)

References

External links

 Official website of RUET
 Website of Robotic Society of RUET

Educational institutions established in 1964
1964 establishments in East Pakistan
Technological institutes of Bangladesh
Public engineering universities of Bangladesh
Engineering universities and colleges in Bangladesh
Education in Rajshahi